The 0s began on January 1, AD 1 and ended on December 31, AD 9, covering the first nine years of the Common Era. It is one of two "0-to-9" decade-like timespans that contain nine years, along with the 0s BC. 

In Europe, the 0s saw the continuation of conflict between the Roman Empire and Germanic tribes in the Early Imperial campaigns in Germania. Vinicius, Tiberius and Varus led Roman forces in multiple punitive campaigns, before sustaining a major defeat at the hands of Arminius in the Battle of the Teutoburg Forest. Concurrently, the Roman Empire fought the Bellum Batonianum against a rebelling alliance of native peoples led by Bato the Daesitiate in Illyricum, which was suppressed in AD 9. A conflict also took place in Korea, where Daeso, King of Dongbuyeo invaded Goguryeo with a 50,000-man army in AD 6. He was forced to retreat when heavy snow began to fall, stopping the conflict until the next decade. In China, the last ruler of the Chinese Western Han Dynasty (Ruzi Ying) was deposed, allowing Wang Mang to establish the Xin dynasty.

Literary works from the 0s include works from the ancient Roman poet Ovid; the Ars Amatoria, an instructional elegy series in three books, Metamorphoses, a poem which chronicles the history of the world from its creation to the deification of Julius Caesar within a loose mythico-historical framework, and Ibis, a curse poem written during his years in exile across the Black Sea for an offense against Augustus. Nicolaus of Damascus wrote the 15-volume History of the World.

Estimates for the world population by AD 1 range from 150 to 300 million. A census was concluded in China in AD 2: final numbers showed a population of nearly 60 million (59,594,978 people in slightly more than 12 million households). The census is one of the most accurate surveys in Chinese history. Dionysius Exiguus assigned Jesus's birth date in AD 1, in his anno Domini era according to at least one scholar. However, most scholars think Dionysius placed the birth of Jesus in the previous year, 1 BC. Furthermore, most modern scholars do not consider Dionysius' calculations authoritative, placing the event several years earlier (see Chronology of Jesus).

Demographics 

Estimates for the world population in 1 AD range from 150 to 300 million. The below table summarizes estimates by various authors.

Significant people
 Erato, Artaxiad Dynasty Queen of Armenia, 8–5 BC, 2 BC – 2 AD, 6–11
 Ariobarzan of Atropatene, Client King of Armenia, r. 1 BC – 2 AD
 Artavazd V, Client King of Armenia, r. 2–11
 Tigranes V, Artaxiad Dynasty King of Armenia, r. 2–6
 Ping Di, Emperor of Han Dynasty China, r. 1 BC – 5 AD
 Ruzi Ying, Emperor of Han Dynasty China, r. 6–9
 Wang Mang, Usurper Emperor of the short-lived Xin Dynasty in China r. 9–23
 Antiochus III, King of Commagene, r. 12 BC – 17 AD
 Arminius, German war chief
 Arshak II, King of Caucasian Iberia, r. 20 BC-1 AD
 Pharasmanes I, King of Caucasian Iberia, r. 1-58
 Strato II and Strato III, co-kings of the Indo-Greek Kingdom, r. 25 BC – 10 AD
 Crimthann Nia Náir, Legendary High King of Ireland, r. 8 BC – AD 9
 Cairbre Cinnchait, Legendary High King of Ireland, r. 9–14
 Suinin, Legendary Emperor of Japan, r. 29 BC – 70 AD
 Natakamani, King of Kush, r. (1 BC – AD 20)
 Abgar V of Edessa, King of Osroene, 4 BC–AD 7, 13–50
 Ma'nu IV, King of Osroene, 7–13
 Phraates V, King of the Parthian Empire, r. 2 BC – 4 AD
 Musa of Parthia, mother and co-ruler with Phraates V, r. 2 BC – 4 AD
 Orodes III, King of the Parthian Empire, r. 4–6
 Vonones I, King of the Parthian Empire, r. 8–12
 Artabanus of Parthia, pretender to the Parthian throne and future King of Parthia
 Caesar Augustus, Roman Emperor (27 BC – AD 14)
 Gaius Caesar, Roman general
 Livy, Roman historian
 Ovid, Roman poet
 Quirinius, Roman nobleman and politician
 Hillel the Elder, Jewish scholar and Nasi of the Sanhedrin, in office c. 31 BC – 9 AD
 Shammai, Jewish scholar and Av Beit Din of the Sanhedrin, in office 20 BC – 20 AD
 Tiberius, Roman general, statesman, and future emperor
 Hyeokgeose, King of Silla, r. 57 BC – 4 AD
 Namhae, King of Silla, r. 4–24

See also
 00s (disambiguation)

References

Sources